Red Hammer Records is an independent record label located in the Portland, Oregon metro area of Battle Ground, Washington. The label was founded in 2006 and is distributed in the United States and digitally throughout the world by Entertainment One Distribution.

History
Red Hammer Records was formed by Darren Bowls in 2006 with the signing of Portland, Oregon metro area band SONSOFDAY, whose 2007 national release garnered critical attention and a Gospel Music Channel video of the year award for the video single "This Place." 2008 started with a bang with the signing of Norwegian bands Dreampilots and Humming People, and the Portland electro-pop group Paper Rings. 2008 saw the limited release of Paper Rings first CD and follow up mid-west tour opening for SONSOFDAY. 2009 brought the release of Humming People's first CD "A Hope No Man Can Bind" in Norway, and GMA "buzz band" Dreampilots much anticipated first US release Comedown. 2011 will see the debut national release from Katelynne Cox on March 22, 2011.

Artists

Current
Dreampilots
Paper Rings
Humming People
Katelynne Cox

Additional and former
Nick Matev
Kate White
Red Rain
D.R. Gooya
SONSOFDAY

See also 
List of record labels

External links
 

American independent record labels
Record labels established in 2006
Indie rock record labels